Bonów refers to the following places in Poland:

 Bonów, Lublin Voivodeship
 Bonów, Lubusz Voivodeship